Vesa Laukkanen (born 9 April 1958) is a Finnish middle-distance runner. He competed in the men's 3000 metres steeplechase at the 1980 Summer Olympics.

References

1958 births
Living people
Athletes (track and field) at the 1980 Summer Olympics
Finnish male middle-distance runners
Finnish male steeplechase runners
Olympic athletes of Finland
Place of birth missing (living people)